Chantal Bailey (-Cermak, née Dunn) (born May 28, 1965). Was a member of the 1994 US Olympic Team for Speedskating. Currently she is coach for the Bemidji, MN Pioneer Speedskating Club .

Biography
Chantal was born May 28 and grew up in Champaign, IL. Which is the same home town of her 1994 Olympic teammate Bonnie Blair, who wrote in Chantal's freshman yearbook, "I really think you should be a speed skater". As a child and a teenager Chantal was a figure skater before turning over to speedskating. At the age of 14 she was diagnosed as bulimic. After graduation from Centennial High School in Champaign, she moved to the Boulder, CO area to get a degree in sports medicine technology. While waiting tables she wanted to exercise, so she purchased a $6 pair of speedskates from a Boulder, CO garage sale and begun speedskating. In 1990 she made the US National Speedskating Team and four years later made the US Olympic Team.

Speedskating
Chantal began speedskating in 1986 and in 1990 made the US National team. Her success came when she was crowned the 1992-93 all-around U.S. women’s speed skating champion and 1994 national champion in the 3,000-meter race. She made the 1994 Olympic team and won the 1995 age-class national championships for speedskating. Chantal retired from competitive speedskating in 1998.

Personal records

Olympic Results

Pioneer Speeedskating Club of Bemidji, MN
In the winter of 2005-2006 Chantal started the Pioneer Skating Club in Bemidji, MN. Her club has hosted to the 2008, 2009, and 2010 National Long Track Marathon.

References

External links
Skateresults.com Chantal Bailey
Bemidji Speedskating

1965 births
Living people
American female speed skaters
Olympic speed skaters of the United States
Sportspeople from Champaign, Illinois
Speed skaters at the 1994 Winter Olympics
21st-century American women